Di che segno sei? (translation: What's Your Sign?) is a 1975 Italian comedy film directed by Sergio Corbucci, starring Alberto Sordi.

Plot
The film is divided into four episodes. In the first Paolo Villaggio plays the role of a sailor from Genoa who learns from his doctor that he will soon become a woman. He  begins to make plans and to daydream of what it will be like to be a woman. In the second episode Adriano Celentano is a former dancer in  Emilia Romagna who now trains a woman for boxing fights. When he meets a beautiful emilian girl who is enrolling in a dance competition where a large sum of money will be awarded to the winners,  Adriano does not miss the opportunity. He first tries to kill the boxer woman he works with, called "King Kong" and then leaves to go dancing with the girl, winning one turn after another. But as the couple wins the first prize Adriano is arrested by the police. In the third episode Renato Pozzetto plays the role of a poor mason from Milan who bets with some friends that he will be able to seduce the wife of his boss. Renato will succeed but will pay the consequences. In the last episode Alberto Sordi plays the role of hick Roman Nando Moriconi (same character of the film Un americano a Roma by Steno - 1954), this time he works as a body guard of a prominent Italian financier who has been the victim of many attempts to kidnap him .

Cast
Alberto Sordi as  Nando Moriconi 
Paolo Villaggio as  Dante Bompazzi
Renato Pozzetto as  Basilio 
Adriano Celentano as  Alfredo, a.k.a. 'Fred Astaire' 
Giovanna Ralli as  contessa Cristina 
Mariangela Melato as  Marietta, a.k.a. 'Claquette' 
Luciano Salce as  Conte Leonardo 
Giuliana Calandra as  Maria Bompazzi 
 Jack La Cayenne	as 	Enea Giacomazzi, a.k.a. 'Bolero'
Lilli Carati    as Bolero's partner
 Massimo Boldi	as	Massimo

External links
 

1970s Italian-language films
1975 films
1975 comedy films
Films directed by Sergio Corbucci
Films set in Genoa
Films set in Emilia-Romagna
Films set in Milan
Italian LGBT-related films
Films about security and surveillance
Adultery in films
Italian comedy films
Italian dance films
1970s dance films
Films with screenplays by Mario Amendola
1970s Italian films